Abdelhak Aatakni (born 9 February 1988 in Aïn Sebaâ) is a Moroccan boxer. He competed at the 2012 Summer Olympics in the men's light welterweight, but was defeated in the first round by Richarno Colin of Mauritius.

References

Living people
Light-welterweight boxers
Boxers at the 2012 Summer Olympics
Olympic boxers of Morocco
1988 births
Moroccan male boxers
21st-century Moroccan people
20th-century Moroccan people